A meiping is a type of vase in Chinese ceramics. It is traditionally used to display branches of plum blossoms. The meiping was first made of stoneware during the Tang dynasty (618–907). It was originally used as a wine vessel, but since the Song dynasty (960–1279) it also became popular as a plum vase and got its name "meiping". It is tall, with a narrow base spreading gracefully into a wide body, followed by a sharply-rounded shoulder, a short and narrow neck, and a small opening.

They may have lids, and many lids have no doubt been lost. The equivalent shape in Korean ceramics, where it was derived from Chinese examples, is called a Maebyeong. A distinct variant is the "truncated meiping", where there is only the top half of the usual shape, giving a squat vase with a wide bottom. This is largely restricted to Cizhou ware.

References

External links

A Handbook of Chinese Ceramics from The Metropolitan Museum of Art

Pottery shapes
Chinese porcelain
Chinese pottery
Vases